Frank Warren (born 28 February 1952) is an English boxing manager and promoter. Warren and his son George own and run Queensberry Promotions. Warren was also a founder of the British boxing television channel BoxNation which ran for over 11 years from 2012.

Frank Warren has promoted and managed world champions and top ranked fighters including Naseem Hamed, Frank Bruno, Tyson Fury, Josh Warrington, Joe Calzaghe, Nigel Benn, Billy Joe Saunders, Steve Collins, Chris Eubank, Amir Khan and Ricky Hatton.

Early life and early career
The son of a bookmaker, Warren trained as a solicitor's clerk with J Tickle & Co on Southampton Row in London.

Promoter
Warren was approached by his second-cousin Lenny McLean who having just lost a fight and wanting a rematch, could not find a promoter. Warren agreed to become an unlicensed promoter, getting McLean a trainer who had worked with Chris Finnegan, and made the rematch at the Rainbow Theatre, Finsbury Park.

Warren's first licensed show was held at the Bloomsbury Crest Hotel, in London in 1980, promoting two unknown United States heavyweights. However, although he had arranged TV coverage, he was blocked from broadcasting the fight by the British Boxing Board of Control rules preventing first-timers from televising their first fights. However Warren was later given his first TV date with the BBC in a British light welterweight fight between London's champion Clinton McKenzie and Coventry contender Steve Early.

Warren soon became a leading figure in British boxing, and since has managed some of Britain's best boxers of the last twenty five years, including 'Prince' Naseem Hamed, Nigel Benn, Joe Calzaghe, Ricky Hatton, Derek Chisora, Nicky Piper and Amir Khan.

Warren guided Hamed to become Britain's youngest ever world champion when he beat Steve Robinson to win the WBO Featherweight title at the Cardiff Arms Park, Wales, in 1995; he oversaw the ascent of Ricky Hatton to the IBF Light Welterweight Championship of the World after beating Kostya Tszyu in 2005; and has been with former IBF and WBO/WBC/WBA/Ring Magazine Super Middleweight Champion Joe Calzaghe throughout the majority of his 46 fight unbeaten career.

Warren signed the 2004 Olympic Lightweight silver medallist Amir Khan and guided him to be a world champion in 2009, but the two split in 2010. He continued this post-Olympic record by signing others after the 2008 Olympics.

In December 2007, Warren was elected to the International Boxing Hall of Fame and was inducted in June 2008.

Sports network
Warren's major vehicles for promotion are Sports Network Ltd and Sports Network Europe, which employ 15 people, but rises up to 1,000 on the day of a big fight. In 1995 Warren signed an exclusive deal with the pay-TV operator British Sky Broadcasting, but having moved his promotions successfully around all of the UK television networks, he has now severed all ties with Sky Sports.

After the loss of the dispute with Calzaghe, Sports Network Ltd was put into administration.

Boxing

Current stable

BoxNation
In July 2011, Warren started the BoxNation TV channel alongside the Boxing Channel Media Limited group. The channel was originally free-to-air and only released on the Sky platform, but on 1 December 2011 BoxNation was broadcast on Virgin Media for the first time and became a subscription channel at the same time.

Shooting
On 30 November 1989, Warren was shot outside the Broadway Theatre in Barking by an unknown assailant wearing a balaclava, who was never caught. A 9mm bullet from a Luger pistol missed Warren's heart by an inch, and he lost half a lung and parts of his ribs. The former boxer, Terry Marsh, who had become Warren's first world champion two years earlier, was accused of the shooting but acquitted by a jury.

Other interests
Warren was also the founder and owner of the London Arena. Beset by transport problems, he was about to raise additional finance until shot - he says the incident cost him £8million, as he was forced to sell it in 1996.

Warren has major share holdings in various hotel developments in Portugal, and a share in one of New York City's top restaurants, the Michelin-starred 81, off Central Park.

Warren also invested in Hertford Town FC.

Warren also invested in Bedford RFC "Bedford Blues" during the 1996–97 season, taking over as chairman from Ian Bullerwell. The club went on to win the Allied Dunbar Division 2 Championship in 1998.

Personal life
Warren is a fan of Arsenal F.C. He lives in
Watton-at-Stone in Hertfordshire with his family.

Notable television appearances
Warren appeared as himself in "Raging Pig", an episode of Operation Good Guys. Warren observed, "A few people have seen that show! It is funny, I read somewhere that someone had done a review on one of our videos and they asked why I'm such a miserable bastard - it goes to show that they don't know me. Ask anyone who knows me; I'm a pretty outgoing person. Operation Good Guys was put together by Ray Burdis, who is a good mate of mine, and I enjoyed it. Maybe people get pre-conceived views of who I am but I do enjoy myself and have my bit of fun. Ask anyone who really knows me and they'll tell you that some of stuff that is said on the Internet doesn't accurately describe me, but people have an opinion and are entitled to express it."

References

External links
Official site
Frank Warren - The Best Promotor in Britain

1952 births
British boxing promoters
British shooting survivors
British sports agents
English businesspeople
Living people
People from Islington (district)
People from Watton-at-Stone